Kiril Popov may refer to:
 Kiril Popov (table tennis)
 Kiril Popov (footballer)